Marius Bruat (27 June 1930 – 1 January 2020) was a French footballer who played as a midfielder.

Biography
Bruat was recruited in 1950 to FC Sochaux-Montbéliard. He played for the France national team on 17 December 1953 in a World Cup qualifying match against Luxembourg.

In 1957, Lefèvre-Utile released a photo album of "French Football Champions", which featured Bruat.

In 1964, he was a finalist in the Coupe de la Ligue as coach of RC Strasbourg Alsace. He served as head coach of SR Colmar from 1976 to 1978, and then AS Sundhoffen from 1978 to 1983.

Marius Bruat died on 1 January 2020, at the age of 89.

References

External links

 

1930 births
2020 deaths
French footballers
France international footballers
FC Sochaux-Montbéliard players
Toulouse FC players
Red Star F.C. players
FC Rouen players
FC Rouen managers
French football managers
Association football defenders